Imtan is a village in As Suwaydā' Governorate, southern Syria. According to the Syria Central Bureau of Statistics (CBS), Imtan had a population of 2,495 in the 2004 census.

History
It is believed that the village has been inhabited since 6000 BCE, although there is little evidence supporting this. Imtan has many archeological sites spanning many eras.
The village played a major role in the Great Syrian Revolution against France in 1925.

In 1596 Imtan appeared in the Ottoman tax registers as al-Mubattan and was part of the nahiya of Bani Malik as-Sadir in the Sanjak of Hauran. It had an all  Muslim population consisting of 7 households and 2 bachelors.  The villagers paid a fixed tax-rate of 20% on agricultural products, including on wheat, barley, summer crops, goats and/or beehives; a total of 3,400  akçe.

Demographics
The village is mainly inhabited by Druze. The inhabitants are predominantly poor. The inhabitants are well educated and the village is home to over 300 university graduates, amongst them are 80 engineers and 68 doctors.

The inhabitants look to collaborative work as a way to compensate for the absence of government services. They collaborated to build a school, medical center, and cooperative retail store. They have also established a farmer's union and community fund which offers help to the poorest families.

References

Bibliography

Further reading
Kissel, T. 2002a. A Reused Milestone from Imtan (Southern Syria)-New	Evidence on the Limes Arabicus in the Second Century AD. In: Freeman, P. et al., eds. Limes XVIII. Proceedings of the XVlllth International Congress of Roman Frontier Studies held in Amman, Jordan (September 2000) I. (BAR International Series 1084). Oxford: 161-174.

External links
 Map of the town, Google Maps

Populated places in Salkhad District
Archaeological sites in as-Suwayda Governorate
Druze communities in Syria